Lucy S. Stoyles is a Canadian politician, who was elected to the Newfoundland and Labrador House of Assembly in the 2021 provincial election. She represents the electoral district of Mount Pearl North as a member of the Liberal Party of Newfoundland and Labrador.

Prior to entering provincial politics, Stoyles was a Mount Pearl city councillor for 25 years and constituency assistant to Mount Pearl-Southlands MHA Paul Lane.

Election results

References

Living people
Liberal Party of Newfoundland and Labrador MHAs
Newfoundland and Labrador municipal councillors
People from Mount Pearl
Women MHAs in Newfoundland and Labrador
21st-century Canadian politicians
Year of birth missing (living people)